The Filmfare Best Art Direction Award is given by the Filmfare magazine as part of its annual Filmfare Awards for Hindi films.

Although the awards started in 1954, this category was started only in 1956.

Superlatives

Awards

See also
 Filmfare Awards
 Bollywood
 Cinema of India

External links
Filmfare Awards Best Art Direction

Art Direction
Awards for best art direction